Eastside High School (EHS) is a public high school located in Taylors, a suburb of Greenville, South Carolina, United States. It is a public school under the jurisdiction of the Greenville County School District.

Principals
Eastside has had 14 principals throughout its history.
John Durr: 1970–1973
Eddie Jones: 1973–1975
Leonard Pellicer: 1975–1977
J. Brodie Bricker: 1977–1987 
Betty Workman: 1987–1988
Lacy Wilkins: 1988–1993 
Ken Peake: 1993–1995
Dave Quick: 1995–1998
Buddy Blackmon: 1998–2000
Sheryl Taylor: 2000–2006
John Tharp: 2006–2010 
Michael Thorne: 2010–2019
Tina Bishop: 2019–present

Athletics

Eastside High School's teams have won over 51 state championships. Eastside's athletics is most noted for wrestling, soccer, cross country, swimming, volleyball, and basketball.
Cheerleading: 1996, 1999, 2000, 2002, 2004
Football: 1977
Boys cross country: 1987, 1988
Boys golf: 2009
Boys soccer: 1983, 1985, 1986, 2005, 2011, 2014
Boys swimming: 2015, 2016, 2017, 2018, 2019
Girls cross country: 2011, 2016
Girls soccer: 1998, 2000, 2003, 2007
Girls swimming: 2017, 2018, 2019
Girls tennis: 1980
Girls volleyball: 2011, 2015
Wrestling: 2000, 2002, 2004, 2005, 2006, 2007, 2008, 2009, 2012, 2013, 2016, 2017, 2018, 2019, 2020, 2021, 2022
Boys Tennis 2016, 2018
Baseball: 2019, 2022

Notable alumni
 Joe Erwin  entrepreneur and politician from South Carolina
 André Goodman  former NFL cornerback, played college football at the University of South Carolina

References 

Educational institutions established in 1970
Public high schools in South Carolina
Schools in Greenville County, South Carolina
1970 establishments in South Carolina